The 2021–22 WRU Championship (or Admiral Championship for sponsorship reasons) was the ninth season of the WRU Championship, the second tier of club rugby in Wales run by the Welsh Rugby Union. The league expanded to a 14 team format, up from 12 in previous seasons. The league was won by Bargoed for the second time; the first being the 2014–15 season.

The season was truncated and not all fixtures fulfilled. Ultimately, this had no bearing on the title as Bargoed could not be mathematically caught.

The large amount of cancelled fixtures caused friction from some clubs within the league, the most vocal being Pontypool, who called for the entire WRU Community Game Board to resign.

Structure 
For 2021-22, instead of a traditional league, each team played each other team on a home or away basis for a total of 13 games. League points were awarded as such – 4 points for a win, 2 for a draw and 0 for a loss. Teams could also earn an additional bonus point by scoring four or more tries in a match and/or losing by less than seven points. The club with the most points after 13 games were declared the winners, although not all clubs completed their full 13 matches. As the previous two seasons were disrupted during the COVID-19 pandemic, there was no promotion or relegation this year.

Teams 
As the previous seasons (2019–20 & 2020–21) were cancelled due to COVID-19 pandemic, no teams were promoted or relegated from any league. Therefore, the same 14 teams that competed the previous season will compete again this season.

Standings

References

External links 
 

Welsh Championship
WRU Championship
Wales